Tania Belvederesi (born 31 January 1978) is a road cyclist from Italy. She represented her nation at the 2004 UCI Road World Championships.

References

External links
 profile at Procyclingstats.com

1978 births
Italian female cyclists
Living people
Place of birth missing (living people)
Sportspeople from Ancona
Cyclists from Marche